Mount Homa is a mountain located in western Kenya. It forms a broad peninsula on the southern shore of Winam Gulf, an extension of Lake Victoria.

In the Luo language Got Uma or God Marahuma means "famous mountain".

The mountain is formed of carbonatite lava and dates from Miocene to Pleistocene.  Along with the active Ol Doinyo Lengai, it is one of the very few carbonatite volcanoes in the world.

Homa peninsula is part of Homa Bay County. The village of Kanjira (Kanjera)
is eponymous of the Kanjera paleontological site, first excavated by Louis Leakey in the 1930s. 
It is one of the oldest known Oldowan sites, dated at c. 2 million years old.

See also
List of volcanoes in Kenya

References

External links 
 

Homa
Homa
Homa